Robert Frank Grill (November 30, 1943 – July 11, 2011) was an American singer, songwriter and bass guitarist, best known as lead singer and bassist of the rock and roll group The Grass Roots. Though not a founding member, Grill was the longest-serving member of the band prior to his death in 2011.

Career
Grill was a native of Hollywood, California, where he attended Hollywood High School. Soon after graduation, he began working at American Recording Studios with musician friends Cory Wells and John Kay (who later formed Three Dog Night and Steppenwolf, respectively).

Grill was asked to join The Grass Roots, which grew out of a project originating from Dunhill Records owned by Lou Adler. Writers/producers P.F. Sloan and Steve Barri (The Mamas & the Papas, Tommy Roe, Four Tops and Dusty Springfield) were asked by Dunhill to write songs that would capitalize on the growing interest in the folk-rock movement. After their song “Where Were You When I Needed You” — recorded as a demo with P.F. Sloan as lead singer — was released under the name “The Grass Roots” and received airplay in the San Francisco Bay Area, Dunhill searched for a band to become The Grass Roots. After the first group they chose departed, a Los Angeles band composed of Creed Bratton, Rick Coonce, Warren Entner, and Kenny Fukomoto was recruited to become The Grass Roots.

When Fukumoto was drafted into the army, Grill was brought in as his replacement. With Grill as lead singer, they recorded another version of "Where Were You When I Needed You" and he became the band’s longest serving member, appearing with them for more than four decades. Grill went on to produce and manage the band and became owner of The Grass Roots name.

Classic rock festivals

The Grass Roots played at the Fantasy Fair and Magic Mountain Music Festival on Sunday, June 11, 1967, in the "summer of love" as their top ten hit "Let's Live For Today" was hitting the airwaves. This music festival is important because it occurred before the Monterey Pop Festival but did not have a movie to document it for the ages (see List of electronic music festivals).  On Sunday, October 27, 1968, they played at the San Francisco Pop Festival and then played at the Los Angeles Pop Festival and Miami Pop Festival in December of that year as their top 10 hit "Midnight Confessions" was hitting the airwaves.

The Grass Roots played at Newport Pop Festival 1969 at Devonshire Downs which was a racetrack at the time but now is part of the North Campus for California State University at Northridge. They played on Sunday June 22 which was the final day of the festival as their top twenty hit "Wait A Million Years" was hitting the airwaves. In Canada, they played at the Vancouver Pop Festival at the Paradise Valley Resort in British Columbia in August 1969 (see List of electronic music festivals).

Solo career & 60's nostalgia

Grill launched a solo career in 1979, assisted on his solo album by several members of Fleetwood Mac. Responding to '60s nostalgia, Grill then led The Grass Roots (billed "The Grass Roots Starring Rob Grill") and toured the United States until his death in 2011.

Compositions and musical release performance

Grill composed sixteen songs for The Grass Roots and his solo album. One of these,  "Come On and Say It", appeared as a single "A" side. His other 15 compositions appeared on single "B" sides and albums. He wrote frequently with Warren Entner and they were considered a songwriting team. Grill played with The Grass Roots on 16 albums, seven of which charted. He took part in 32 Grass Roots singles released, 21 of which charted.

Death
Grill died from complications of a head injury sustained in a fall in June 2011. After suffering two strokes following the fall, each located in different parts of his brain, he fell into a coma. With his wife Nancy by his side, Grill died July 11, 2011 in an Orlando, Florida hospital from complications after a stroke.

Discography

Singles

+ - Gold Record - RIAA Certification

Albums

(All albums are with the Grass Roots, unless otherwise noted)

+ - Gold Record - RIAA Certification

References 

American male singer-songwriters
American rock songwriters
American rock singers
American rock bass guitarists
American male bass guitarists
20th-century American singers
Singers from Los Angeles
1943 births
2011 deaths
Guitarists from Los Angeles
20th-century American bass guitarists
20th-century American male singers
Singer-songwriters from California